In Greek mythology, Amphialus or Amphialos (Ancient Greek: Άμφίαλος means 'of two seas') may refer to the following figures:

 Amphialus, son of Neoptolemus and Andromache.
 Amphialus, a man in the crew of Menelaus during his return from Troy.
 Amphialos, one of the comrades of the Greek hero Odysseus. When the latter and 12 of his crew came into the port of Sicily, the Cyclops Polyphemus seized and confined them. Along with the Ithacan king and six others namely: Lycaon, Alkimos, Amphidamas, Antilochus and Eurylochos, Amphialos survived the manslaughter of his six companions by the monster.
 Amphialus, a young Phaeacian nobleman and son of Polyneus, son of Tecton. He competed in the games arranged to honour Odysseus.
 Amphialus, one of the Suitors of Penelope from Ithaca along with 11 other wooers. He, with the other suitors, was slain by Odysseus with the aid of Eumaeus, Philoetius, and Telemachus.

Notes

References 

 Apollodorus, The Library with an English Translation by Sir James George Frazer, F.B.A., F.R.S. in 2 Volumes, Cambridge, MA, Harvard University Press; London, William Heinemann Ltd. 1921. ISBN 0-674-99135-4. Online version at the Perseus Digital Library. Greek text available from the same website.
 Gaius Julius Hyginus, Fabulae from The Myths of Hyginus translated and edited by Mary Grant. University of Kansas Publications in Humanistic Studies. Online version at the Topos Text Project.
 Homer, The Odyssey with an English Translation by A.T. Murray, PH.D. in two volumes. Cambridge, MA., Harvard University Press; London, William Heinemann, Ltd. 1919. . Online version at the Perseus Digital Library. Greek text available from the same website.
 Pausanias, Description of Greece with an English Translation by W.H.S. Jones, Litt.D., and H.A. Ormerod, M.A., in 4 Volumes. Cambridge, MA, Harvard University Press; London, William Heinemann Ltd. 1918. . Online version at the Perseus Digital Library
 Pausanias, Graeciae Descriptio. 3 vols. Leipzig, Teubner. 1903.  Greek text available at the Perseus Digital Library.
 Tzetzes, John, Allegories of the Odyssey translated by Goldwyn, Adam J. and Kokkini, Dimitra. Dumbarton Oaks Medieval Library, Harvard University Press, 2015. 

Suitors of Penelope
Characters in the Odyssey
Phaeacians in Greek mythology
Ithacan characters in Greek mythology